Kongpipop Petchyindee (ก้องพิภพ เพชรยินดี) is a Thai retired Muay Thai fighter.

Biography and career

Kongpipop started Muay Thai training at 8 years old. He joined the Sit Kru Od gym and competed in the Isan region before being brought to Bangkok at the age of 15. When the Sit Kru Od camp closed Kongpipop's trainer started to use the Petchyindee camp facilities where Kongpipop followed him.

In 2002 Kongpipop won the Toyota marathon tournament and the Thailand title at 126 lbs. He became an elite fighter on the Bangkok circuit and defeated notable champions in the following years such as Watcharachai Kaewsamrit, Nongbee Kiatyongyut, Lerdsila Chumpairtour, Orono Majestic Gym, Attachai Fairtex and Singdam Kiatmuu9. In 2005 Kongpipop was matched with the best fighter of his era Saenchai. He received a purse of 120,000 baht for this bout.

On September 27, 2003 Kongpipop travelled to Japan to face Tsogto Amara at AJKF KNOCK DOWN. He won the fight by unanimous decision.

The most significant accopmplishment of Kongpipop's career came on November 17, 2006 when he won Gaiyanghadao Tournament, defeating three champions in one day. He defeated Singdam Kiatmuu9 on points in the quarter finals, in semi finals he knocked out Attachai Fairtex and knocked out Nopparat Kiatkhamtorn in the final to win the tournament.

Kongpipop travelled to France on November 29, 2009 to face Kamel Jemel for the WBC Muay Thai World Lightweight title. He won the fight by doctor stoppage due to a cut from an elbow in the first round.

In the later part of the 2000s Kongpipop became addicted to drugs and alcohol which led him to be incarcerated for a year in 2009.
Following his release he returned to his native province before becoming a trainer at Petchyindee gym in 2016.

Titles and accomplishments
World Boxing Council Muay Thai 
 2007 WBC Muay Thai World Lightweight Champion
Professional Boxing Association of Thailand (PAT) 
 2002 Thailand 126 lbs Champion
Lumpinee Stadium 
 2004 Lumpinee Stadium 126 lbs Champion
Tournaments
 2002 Toyota Marathon 126 lbs Tournament Winner
 2006 Gaiyanghadao 135 lbs Tournament Winner

Fight record

|- style="background:#cfc;"
| 2009-03-28 || Win ||align=left| Otmar Diagne || Battle of Sweden || Stockholm, Sweden || TKO (Doctor stoppage)|| 3 ||

|-  bgcolor="#cfc"
| 2008-11-29 || Win ||align=left| Fasura Wor.Petchpun || Lumpinee Stadium || Bangkok, Thailand || KO || 3 ||

|-  bgcolor="#fbb"
| 2008-06-24 || Loss ||align=left| Petchmankong Petchfergus || Lumpinee Stadium || Bangkok, Thailand || KO || 4 ||

|-  bgcolor="#fbb"
| 2008-02-28 || Loss ||align=left| Fasura Wor.Petchpun || Sor.Sommai, Rajadamnern Stadium || Bangkok, Thailand || KO || 3 ||

|- style="background:#cfc;"
| 2007-11-29 || Win ||align=left| Kamel Jemel || France VS Thailande || Paris, France || TKO (Doctor stoppage)|| 1 || 
|-
! style=background:white colspan=9 |

|-  bgcolor="#fbb"
| 2007-07-20 || Loss ||align=left| Khem Sor.Ploenchit || Sor.Pumpanmuang, Lumpinee Stadium || Bangkok, Thailand || TKO || 5 ||

|-  style="background:#fbb;"
| 2007-02-06 || Loss ||align=left| Attachai Fairtex || Fairtex, Lumpinee Stadium || Bangkok, Thailand || Decision || 5||3:00

|-  style="background:#cfc;"
| 2006-11-17 || Win ||align=left| Nopparat Keatkhamtorn || Gaiyanghadao Tournament, Final || Nakhon Ratchasima, Thailand || KO (Knees)|| 2 || 
|-
! style=background:white colspan=9 |

|-  style="background:#cfc;"
| 2006-11-17 || Win ||align=left| Attachai Fairtex || Gaiyanghadao Tournament, Semi Final || Nakhon Ratchasima, Thailand || KO (Knees) || 2 ||

|-  style="background:#cfc;"
| 2006-11-17 || Win ||align=left| Singdam Kiatmuu9 || Gaiyanghadao Tournament, Quarter Final || Nakhon Ratchasima, Thailand || Decision || 3||3:00

|-  style="background:#cfc;"
| 2006-08-08 || Win ||align=left| Samranchai 96Peenang || Fairtex, Lumpinee Stadium || Bangkok, Thailand || Decision || 5 || 3:00

|-  style="background:#fbb;"
| 2006-05-23 || Loss ||align=left| Attachai Fairtex || Fairtex, Lumpinee Stadium || Bangkok, Thailand || Decision || 5||3:00

|-  style="background:#cfc;"
| 2006-04-04 || Win ||align=left| Petchnueng Sit Or || Kiatpetch, Lumpinee Stadium || Bangkok, Thailand || KO || 4||

|-  style="background:#cfc;"
| 2006-02-10 || Win ||align=left| Banpot Sor.Boonya|| Fairtex, Lumpinee Stadium || Bangkok, Thailand || KO || 4||

|-  style="background:#fbb;"
| 2005-11-15 || Loss ||align=left| Singdam Kiatmuu9 || Lumpinee Stadium || Bangkok, Thailand || Decision || 5 || 3:00

|- style="background:#fbb;"
| 2005-09-06 || Loss ||align=left| Saenchai Sor.Khamsing || Petchyindee, Lumpini Stadium || Bangkok, Thailand || Decision || 5 || 3:00

|-  bgcolor="#cfc"
| 2005-07-19 || Win ||align=left| Orono Majestic Gym || Petchyindee, Lumpinee Stadium || Bangkok, Thailand || Decision || 5 || 3:00

|-  bgcolor="#cfc"
| 2005-06-17 || Win ||align=left| Nopparat Kiatkhamtorn|| Wanboonya, Lumpinee Stadium || Bangkok, Thailand || KO || 2 ||

|-  bgcolor="#cfc"
| 2005-05-05 || Win ||align=left| Sakadpetch Sor.Sakulpan|| Petchthongkham + Petchyindee, Rajadamnern Stadium || Bangkok, Thailand || Decision || 5 || 3:00

|-  style="background:#cfc;"
| 2005-02-22 || Win ||align=left| Sailom Rachanon || Wanboonya + Petchpiya, Lumpinee Stadium || Bangkok, Thailand || Decision || 5 || 3:00

|-  bgcolor="#cfc"
| 2005-01-21 || Win ||align=left| Sakadpetch Sor.Sakulpan|| Wanboonya, Lumpinee Stadium || Bangkok, Thailand || Decision || 5 || 3:00

|-  style="background:#fbb;"
| 2004-12-07 || Loss ||align=left| Nopparat Keatkhamtorn || Lumpinee Stadium || Bangkok, Thailand || Decision || 5 || 3:00
|-
! style=background:white colspan=9 |

|-  bgcolor="#cfc"
| 2004-11-12 || Win ||align=left| Pornpithak Phet-Udomchai|| Fairtex, Lumpinee Stadium || Bangkok, Thailand || Decision || 5 || 3:00
|-
! style=background:white colspan=9 |

|-  bgcolor="#c5d2ea"
| 2004-10-15 || Draw ||align=left| Orono Majestic Gym || Petchpiya, Lumpinee Stadium || Bangkok, Thailand || Decision || 5 || 3:00

|-  bgcolor="#cfc"
| 2004-08-24 || Win ||align=left| Sibmuen Laemthongkhaet || Fairtex, Lumpinee Stadium || Bangkok, Thailand ||  Decision || 5 || 3:00

|-  bgcolor="#fbb"
| 2004-06-17 || Loss ||align=left| Anuwat Kaewsamrit || Daorungchujarean, Rajadamnern Stadium || Bangkok, Thailand || TKO (leg kicks) || 2 ||

|-  bgcolor="#cfc"
| 2004-05-14 || Win ||align=left| Yodbuangam Lukbanyai || Fairtex, Lumpinee Stadium || Bangkok, Thailand || KO (Elbow) || 4 ||

|-  bgcolor="#cfc"
| 2004-04-23 || Win ||align=left| Charlie Sor Chaitamil|| Wanboonya, Lumpinee Stadium || Bangkok, Thailand || KO || 3 ||

|-  bgcolor="#cfc"
| 2004-03-26 || Win ||align=left| Orono Majestic Gym || Petchyindee + Weerapon, Lumpinee Stadium || Bangkok, Thailand || Decision || 5 || 3:00

|-  bgcolor="#c5d2ea"
| 2004-02-24 || Draw ||align=left| Orono Majestic Gym || Petchyindee + Weerapon, Lumpinee Stadium || Bangkok, Thailand || Decision || 5 || 3:00

|-  style="background:#fbb;"
| 2004-01-24 || Loss ||align=left| Singdam Kiatmuu9 || Lumpinee Stadium || Bangkok, Thailand || Decision || 5 || 3:00
|-
! style=background:white colspan=9 |

|-  style="background:#cfc;"
| 2003-12-18 || Win ||align=left| Lerdsila Chumpairtour || Daorungchujaroen, Rajadamnern Stadium || Bangkok, Thailand || Decision || 5 || 3:00

|- style="background:#cfc;"
| 2003-09-27|| Win || align=left| Tsogto Amara || All Japan Kickboxing Federation KNOCK DOWN || Tokyo, Japan || Decision || 5 || 3:00

|-  style="background:#fbb;"
| 2003-07-29 || Loss ||align=left| Singdam Kiatmuu9 || Lumpinee Stadium || Bangkok, Thailand || Decision || 5 || 3:00

|- style="background:#cfc;"
| 2003-06-13 || Win ||align=left| Khunpinit Kiattawan || Petchpiya, Lumpinee Stadium || Bangkok, Thailand || Decision || 5 || 3:00
|-
! style=background:white colspan=9 |

|- style="background:#cfc;"
| 2003-04-26 || Win ||align=left| Nongbee Kiatyongyut || OneSongchai || Chachoengsao, Thailand || Decision || 5 || 3:00

|-  bgcolor="#fbb"
|  2003-02-07 || Loss||align=left| Orono Majestic Gym || || Bangkok, Thailand || Decision  || 5 || 3:00

|-  bgcolor="#cfc"
| 2002-12- || Win ||align=left| Charlie Sor Chaitamil || Lumpinee Stadium|| Bangkok, Thailand || Decision  || 5 || 3:00

|-  style="background:#cfc;"
| 2002-12-03 || Win||align=left| Watcharachai Kaewsamrit || Lumpinee Stadium Anniversary || Bangkok, Thailand || Decision || 5 || 3:00

|-  style="background:#cfc;"
| 2002-11- || Win||align=left| Sinchainoi Sor.Kittichai || Lumpinee Stadium || Bangkok, Thailand || KO || 1 || 

|-  style="background:#cfc;"
| 2002- || Win||align=left| Ekasit Sitkriangkrai || Lumpinee Stadium || Bangkok, Thailand || Decision || 5 || 3:00

|-  style="background:#cfc;"
| 2002- || Win||align=left| Thanongsak Sit-O || Lumpinee Stadium || Bangkok, Thailand || KO || 1 || 

|-  style="background:#fbb;"
| 2002-09-27 || Loss||align=left| Sangheeran Lukbanyai ||Petchyindee, Lumpinee Stadium || Bangkok, Thailand || Decision || 5 || 3:00

|-  bgcolor="#cfc"
| 2002-09-06 || Win ||align=left| Charlie Sor Chaitamil || Lumpinee Stadium|| Bangkok, Thailand || Decision  || 5 || 3:00
|-
! style=background:white colspan=9 |

|-  bgcolor="#cfc"
| 2002- || Win||align=left| Pornpitak Petchudomchai || Lumpinee Stadium || Bangkok, Thailand || Decision || 5 || 3:00

|-  bgcolor="#fbb"
| 2002-06-01 || Loss ||align=left| Kwanjai Sit Punpantung || Lumpinee Stadium || Bangkok, Thailand || Decision || 5 || 3:00

|-  bgcolor="#cfc"
| 2002-05-03 || Win ||align=left| Dokmaifai Tor.Sitthichai || Lumpinee Stadium || Bangkok, Thailand || KO (Punches)|| 2 ||

|-  bgcolor="#fbb"
| 2002- || Loss ||align=left| Fahsuchon Sit-O || Lumpinee Stadium || Bangkok, Thailand || TKO || 3 || 

|-  bgcolor="#c5d2ea"
| 2002- || Draw||align=left| Yodbuangam Lukbanyai || Lumpinee Stadium || Bangkok, Thailand ||Decision || 5 || 3:00

|-  bgcolor="#fbb"
| 2001-11-02 || Loss ||align=left| Anuwat Kaewsamrit || Lumpinee Stadium || Bangkok, Thailand || KO (Punches) || 3 ||

|-  bgcolor="#fbb"
| 2001-06-08 || Loss ||align=left| Phutawan Burirampukeafi|| Lumpinee Stadium || Bangkok, Thailand || KO || 3 || 3:00

|-  bgcolor="#cfc"
| ? || Win ||align=left| Sot Looknongyangtoy|| Lumpinee Stadium || Bangkok, Thailand || KO (Righ hook) || 2 || 

|-  style="background:#fbb;"
| 2000-12-02 || Loss ||align=left| Pokaew Sitchafuang ||  Omnoi Stadium - Isuzu Cup ||Samut Sakhon, Thailand || Decision || 5 || 3:00

|-
| colspan=9 | Legend:

References

1981 births
Living people
Kongpipop Petchyindee
Kongpipop Petchyindee